Ministry of Interior Affairs may refer to:

 Ministry of Interior Affairs (Afghanistan)
 Ministry of Interior Affairs (Albania)
 Ministry of Interior Affairs (Montenegro)
 Ministry of Interior Affairs (Ukraine)